The Clarence Strait is a narrow strait separating the Iranian island of Qeshm from the Iranian mainland. It is the much smaller counterpart to the Strait of Hormuz. The native name for the strait is Khuran.

The Clarence Strait is host to the most extensive mangrove forest in the Persian Gulf, which is known locally as the Hara forests. The area has been designated as a protected Ramsar site since 1975.

References

Landforms of Hormozgan Province
Straits of Iran
Bodies of water of the Persian Gulf
Straits of Asia
Straits of the Indian Ocean
Ramsar sites in Iran